Douglassia moratensis is a species of sea snail, a marine gastropod mollusc in the family Drilliidae.

Description
The size of an adult shell varies between 10 mm and 14 mm. It has a spiral shaped shell that goes from white to caramel in colour.

Distribution
This species occurs in the demersal zone of the Caribbean Sea off Honduras.

References

 Fallon P.J. (2016). Taxonomic review of tropical western Atlantic shallow water Drilliidae (Mollusca: Gastropoda: Conoidea) including descriptions of 100 new species. Zootaxa. 4090(1): 1–363

External links
 

moratensis
Gastropods described in 2016